DWJC (90.3 FM), broadcasting as 90.3 Radyo Bandera News FM, is a radio station owned and operated by Bandera News Philippines through its licensee, Fairwaves Broadcasting Network. The station's main studio is located at Purok 4, Brgy. Mabolo, Malolos. The station currently operates daily from 6:00 AM to 9:00 PM.

History

As Radyo Bulacan
The provincial government of Bulacan established its own radio called "Radyo Bulacan" under the call letters DWRB on 90.3 FM. Radyo Bulacan broadcasts as a community radio station, airing news, music and local issues regarding the province.

Radyo Bulacan later on moved to 95.9 FM. Currently, the station broadcasts at 103.9 FM.

As DWJC
Around in the mid-2010s, the Colegio de San Jose - Malolos (owners of 88.7 DWAP-FM) acquired the 90.3 frequency and launched its new radio station under the callsign DWJC-FM. JC FM airs in a hybrid format (adult contemporary and community radio).

As Radyo Bandera News FM
In 2017, Palawan-based Bandera News Philippines acquired and reformatted the station as Bandera News FM Bulacan.

References

News and talk radio stations in the Philippines
OPM formatted radio stations in the Philippines
Radio stations in the Philippines